West Chester State College Quadrangle Historic District, also known as the Quadrangle Historic District, is a group of historic academic buildings and national historic district located on the campus of West Chester University of Pennsylvania in West Chester, Chester County, Pennsylvania. It consists of five contributing buildings built between 1891 and 1940.  They are Recitation Hall (1891-1893), the former Model School (1899, Ruby Jones Hall), the Old Library (1902-1904), Philips Memorial Building (1925-1927), and Anderson Hall (1937-1940). Except for Philips and Anderson, these buildings are all constructed of native Chester County serpentine stone.

It was listed on the National Register of Historic Places on October 8, 1981 for its significance in architecture and education.

Gallery

References

West Chester University
School buildings on the National Register of Historic Places in Pennsylvania
Historic districts on the National Register of Historic Places in Pennsylvania
Historic districts in Chester County, Pennsylvania
National Register of Historic Places in Chester County, Pennsylvania